Reykjavík Cathedral (Icelandic: Dómkirkjan í Reykjavík) is a cathedral church in Reykjavík, Iceland, the seat of the Bishop of Iceland and mother church of the Evangelical Lutheran Church of Iceland, as well as the parish church of the old city centre and environs. It is located at Austurvöllur, and next to it is Alþingishúsið (the parliament house). Since Iceland's parliament, the Alþingi, was resurrected in 1845, each session of parliament has begun with a Mass at the cathedral, and from there the dean of the cathedral leads the members of parliament to the parliament house.

History and architecture
The cathedral was constructed in 1787 from a design by royal building inspector Andreas Hallander. This building was demolished in 1847 to make way for a somewhat larger church building.

Furnishings
The organ boasts three manuals and thirty-one independent voices and was built in Berlin by the Karl Schuke Berliner Orgelbauwerkstatt.

See also 
 List of cathedrals in Iceland

References

Hjörleifur Stefánsson, Guðný Gerður Gunnarsdóttir and Hjörleifur Stefánsson. 1987. Kvosin – Byggingarsaga miðbæjar Reykjavíkur. Torfusamtökin, Reykjavík.

External links

Website of Reykjavík Cathedral (in Icelandic)
Description at kirkjukort.net  (in Icelandic)

Churches in Reykjavík
Cathedrals in Iceland
Church of Iceland